The 2012 French Open men's singles final was the championship tennis match of the men's singles tournament at the 2012 French Open, with Rafael Nadal defeating Novak Djokovic 6–4, 6–3, 2–6, 7–5. It was a Grand Slam final match of historic proportions for both players. Nadal was aiming to become the first man to win seven French Open titles, breaking the record previously held by Björn Borg, who won six titles, and equalling the record held by Chris Evert, who won seven titles. Djokovic was aiming to become the first man since Rod Laver in 1969 to hold all four Grand Slam titles simultaneously. Additionally, since Djokovic had defeated Nadal in the previous three Grand Slam finals, Nadal was attempting to avoid losing in all four tournaments to the same player.

Match
Nadal won the first set 6–4, gaining a break of serve after a long attritional battle. There were several delays due to the erratic rain, but none lasting more than an hour. With Nadal leading by two sets to one, and Djokovic leading 2–1 and serving (up a break) in the fourth set, the match was suspended due to rain; it was initially thought that Djokovic had gained the momentum, having won eight games in a row prior to the suspension of the match. However, Nadal was able to regroup and take the fourth set and seal the victory, after Djokovic double-faulted on championship point down.

Statistics

Post-match reactions

Djokovic: "I could have easily lost the match in the fourth round or even more against Tsonga, but I managed to come to the finals for the first time in my career," Djokovic said. "I should be happy about that, of course. I will be, and I am, but in this moment I am disappointed about this loss because I thought I started to play better in the third set and felt like I could take this match to a fifth set and then everything could be possible, but there was a rain delay when I started to feel really good on the court".

Nadal: "When you lose, it's because you don't deserve the title,". "So in my mind, this was the final I had to win. That's why I was so emotional".

Nadal's Lifetime Coach, Toni Nadal: "For us, it was very important to win here now against Djokovic, because we knew that if he won again, the fourth one, then (Rafa) completing a Grand Slam of losses would have been ugly, and we were very close to doing that."

See also
 Djokovic–Nadal rivalry
 2012 French Open – Men's singles
 2012 Australian Open – Men's singles final
 Longest tennis match records

References

External links 
 Djokovic–Nadal head-to-head at the ATP's official site
 Match details at the ATP's official site

Men's Singles
2012
Novak Djokovic tennis matches
Rafael Nadal tennis matches